Stachyphrynium is a genus of plants native to China, the Indian Subcontinent, and Southeast Asia. It was first described as a genus with this name in 1902.

Species
The Kew World Checklist includes:
 Stachyphrynium borneense - Borneo
 Stachyphrynium calcicola - Borneo
 Stachyphrynium lancifolium - Borneo
 Stachyphrynium latifolium - S Thailand, P Malaysia, Borneo, Java, Sumatra, Sulawesi
 Stachyphrynium longispicatum  - S Thailand, P Malaysia
 Stachyphrynium placentarium - synonym: Phrynium placentarium (Lour.) Merr. - China (Guangdong, Guangxi, Guizhou, Hainan, Tibet, Yunnan) Bhutan, India, Indonesia, Myanmar, Philippines, Thailand, Vietnam
 Stachyphrynium repens - Java, Sumatra, Sulawesi, P Malaysia, Indochina, Andaman Islands
 Stachyphrynium spicatum - Yunnan, India, Sri Lanka, Andaman Island, Myanmar, Thailand, Laos

References

Marantaceae
Zingiberales genera